is a railway station on the Takayama Main Line in the city of Gero, Gifu Prefecture, Japan, operated by Central Japan Railway Company (JR Central).

Lines

Station layout
Gero Station has one ground-level island platform and one ground-level side platform connected by a footbridge. The station has a Midori no Madoguchi staffed ticket office.

Platforms

Adjacent stations

History
Gero Station opened on November 2, 1930. The station was absorbed into the JR Central network upon the privatization of Japanese National Railways (JNR) on April 1, 1987.

Passenger statistics
In fiscal 2015, the station was used by an average of 826 passengers daily (boarding passengers only).

Surrounding area
Gero City Hall
Hida River

Bus routes
Nohi Bus
For Shirakawa-go Bus Terminal
For Takayama Station
For Hida-Osaka Station
For Hida-Hagiwara Station
For Kashimo General Office (At this bus stop, passengers are able to transfer onto Kita-Ena Kotsu Bus bound to Tadachi Station and Nakatsugawa Station)
For Norimasa Yuya

See also
 List of Railway Stations in Japan

References

Railway stations in Gifu Prefecture
Takayama Main Line
Railway stations in Japan opened in 1930
Stations of Central Japan Railway Company
Gero, Gifu